Amaradix bitterrootensis is a species of flea in the family Ceratophyllidae. It was described by Emmett Reid Dunn in 1923.

References 

Ceratophyllidae
Insects described in 1923